4-Hydroxyphenylacetaldehyde, also known as p-hydroxyphenylacetaldehyde, is a natural product with the formula HOC6H4CH2CHO.
It is a derivative of phenylacetaldehyde and occurs as a white solid at room temperature.

Synthesis 
4-Hydroxyphenylacetaldehyde can be synthesized from a parsley tyrosine decarboxylase (L-tyrosine).

Occurrence
4-Hydroxyphenylacetaldehyde is produced from the metabolism of tyramine by monoamine oxidase (MAO) enzymes in humans and the tyramine oxidase (tynA) enzyme in Escherichia coli. In both species, it is subsequently metabolized into 4-hydroxyphenylacetate by aldehyde dehydrogenase (ALDH) enzymes in humans and the phenylacetaldehyde dehydrogenase (feaB) enzyme in E. coli.

The condensation of 4-hydroxyphenylacetaldehyde and dopamine is a key step in the biosynthesis of benzylisoquinoline alkaloids.  These natural products include berberine and morphine.

References

Phenols
Aldehydes
Phenolic human metabolites